William DeWolf Hopper (March 30, 1858September 23, 1935) was an American actor, singer, comedian, and theatrical producer. A star of vaudeville and musical theater, he became best known for performing the popular baseball poem "Casey at the Bat".

Life and career

Hopper was born William D'Wolf Hopper in New York City, the son of John Hopper (born 1815) and Rosalie D'Wolf (born 1827). His father was a wealthy Quaker lawyer and his mother came from a noted Colonial family.  His paternal grandfather Isaac Hopper was a Philadelphia Quaker, and conductor of the Philadelphia station of the Underground Railroad. Though his parents intended that he become a lawyer, Hopper did not enjoy that profession. Hopper was called Willie as a child, and then Will or Wolfie, but when he set out on an acting career he chose his more distinguished middle name as his stage name. It was modified to "DeWolf" because of the frequency that it was mispronounced "Dwolf".

He made his stage debut in New Haven, Connecticut, October 2, 1878. Originally, he wanted to be a serious actor, but at 6' 5" (196 cm) and 230 pounds, he was too large for most dramatic roles. He had a loud bass singing voice, however, and made his mark in musicals, beginning in Harrigan and Hart's company.  He achieved the status of leading man in The Black Hussar (1885) and appeared in the hit Erminie in 1887. Eventually, he starred in more than thirty Broadway musicals, including Castles in the Air (1890), Wang (1891), Panjandrum (1893), and John Philip Sousa's El Capitan (1896). The role that he remembered with greatest pleasure was Old Bill in The Better 'Ole (1919). 

Known for his comic talents, Hopper popularized many comic songs and appeared in a number of Gilbert and Sullivan comic "patter" roles from 1911 to 1915, including The Mikado, Patience, and H.M.S. Pinafore.

A lifelong baseball enthusiast and New York Giants fan, he first performed Ernest Thayer's then-unknown poem "Casey at the Bat" to the Giants and Chicago Cubs the day his friend, Baseball Hall of Fame pitcher Tim Keefe had his record 19-game winning streak stopped, August 14, 1888.  Hopper helped make the comic poem famous and was often called upon to give his colorful, melodramatic recitation, which he did about 10,000 times in his booming voice, reciting it during performances and as part of curtain calls, and on radio. He released a recorded version on phonograph record in 1906, and recited the poem in a short film made in the Phonofilm sound-on-film process in 1923.

It was in The Black Hussar that Hopper first incorporated a baseball theme that drew notice in the sporting press.  To accompany a song with a baseball stanza, "Mr. Hopper enacts the pitcher, Mr. [Digby] Bell, with a bird cage on his head and boxing gloves on his hands, plays catcher, while Mme. [Mathilde] Cottrelly handles a diminutive bat as striker and endeavors to make a 'home run.'"

In 1889, Hopper became founding president of the Actors' Amateur Athletic Association of America.  Back in 1886, besides organizing a regular ball team among actors, he played in a benefit game for a demented playwright.  The following year, he helped organize an actor's benefit for a sick young actress.  In the first inning, someone presented him with an eight-inch sunflower.

Also in 1889, Bell, Hopper and fellow McCaull Comic Opera Company actor Jefferson De Angelis were doing the following skit for their third encore in Boccaccio.  Bell returns "with a bat in his hand, followed by DeWolf Hopper and De Angelis.  The latter has a ball, and as Hopper takes the bat in hand and Bell acts as catcher the former goes through the customary contortion act in pitching, and as Hopper hits the ball he runs off the stage, as if running the bases, and presently returns chased by De Angelis, who passes the ball to Bell as catcher just as Hopper makes a big slide for home base.  The slider tumbles Bell, and when he rises from the somersault all three yell out to the audience for judgment [a ruling], and go off kicking like Anson and [New York captain Buck] Ewing.  It is a rich gag and takes immediately", the Brooklyn Eagle said.

That year, Bell called Hopper "the biggest baseball crank that ever lived.  Physically, of course, he is a corker, but when I say big I mean big morally and intellectually.  Why, he goes up to the baseball [Polo] grounds at One Hundred and Fifty-fifth street after the matinees on Saturday, and he travels this six miles simply to see, perhaps, the two final innings, and any one can imagine the rapidity with which he must scrape off the makeup and get into his street clothes in order to secure even this much.  But he says the Garrison finishes are worth it, and he is perfectly right.  Hopper always was a baseball crank, long before the public knew anything about it."

Bald from childhood (he had alopecia), Hopper wore wigs both on and offstage. In later years, a reaction to harsh medicines that he took for throat problems gave his skin a bluish tinge. Regardless, his powerful voice and great sense of humor seemed an attraction to women all his life.  With an insatiable appetite for young actresses, he left a long trail of six wives and countless mistresses in his wake, he became known by the nickname "The Husband of His Country."

Hopper also appeared in several silent motion pictures, two examples being Don Quixote (1915) and Casey at the Bat (1916). Hopper also appeared in a few short sound films, including one in 1923 when he actually recites Casey at the Bat in an experimental sound film produced by Lee De Forest's Phonofilm process.Hopper was a part of the Triangle Film Corporation, which he described as “the first great flourish” of a “prattling, infant industry”.

He made a Broadway appearance in White Lilacs (1928). He then did Radio City Music Hall Inaugural (1932), and played Dr. Gustave Ziska in The Monster (1933). At the time of his death, he was in Kansas City, Missouri, making a radio appearance. His funeral was at the Little Church Around the Corner, in New York City

His autobiography, Once a Clown, Always a Clown, written with the assistance of Wesley W. Stout, was published in 1927.

Marriages

All of Hopper's marriages ended in divorce.

 At age 21, Hopper was married to his first wife, actress Helen Gardiner, his second cousin.
 His second wife was Ida Mosher. They had one son in 1886, John Allan Hopper, and divorced in 1893.
 1893–1898: His third wife was Edna Wallace.
 1899–1913: His fourth wife was choir singer Nella ( Reardon) Bergen, whom he married in London. She was divorced from actor James Bergen.
 1913–1922: His fifth wife was actress and gossip columnist Hedda Hopper; they had one son, actor William Hopper.
 1925–1935: His sixth wife was vocal instructor Lillian E. "Lulu" Glaser ( Faulkes), a widow.

Theatre credits

DeWolf Hopper Opera Company productions

The Charlatan  [Original, Musical, Comedy, Opera]
Dec 5, 1889 – Jun 17, 1899

Mr. Pickwick  [Original, Musical]
Jan 19, 1903 – May 1903

Stage roles

Lorraine  [Original, Musical, Comedy, Opera]
Feb 28, 1887 – Mar 12, 1887, Gaspard de Chateauvieux

The Begum  [Original, Musical, Comedy, Opera]
Sep 21, 1887 – Dec 10, 1887, Howja-Dhu

Casey at the Bat  [Original, Special, Poem, Solo]
Aug 14, 1888 – Aug 14, 1888, Himself

The Charlatan  [Original, Musical, Comedy, Opera]
Dec 5, 1889 – Jun 17, 1899, Demidoff

Wang  [Original, Musical, Comedy, Operetta]
May 4, 1891 – Oct 3, 1891, Wang

Fiddle-dee-dee [Original, Musical, Burlesque, Extravaganza]
Sep 6, 1900 – Apr 20, 1901
Fiddle-dee-dee,  Hoffman Barr
Quo Vass Iss?, Petrolius
Arizona, Henry Cannedbeef
Exhibit II, The Gay Lord Quex

Hoity Toity [Original, Musical, Burlesque]
Sep 5, 1901 – Apr 19, 1902
Hoity Toity,  General Steele
Depleurisy, Countess Zicka
A Man From Mars, An A.D.T. Man from Mars
The Curl and the Judge,  Judge Charges
DuHurry
Mr. Pickwick  [Original, Musical]
Jan 19, 1903 – May 1903, Pickwick

Wang  [Revival, Musical, Comedy, Operetta]
Apr 18, 1904 – Jun 4, 1904, Wang

Happyland  [Original, Musical, Comedy, Opera]
Oct 2, 1905 – Jun 2, 1906, Ecstaticus

The Pied Piper  [Original, Musical, Comedy]
Dec 3, 1908 – Jan 16, 1909, The Pied Piper

A Matinee Idol  [Original, Musical, Comedy]
Apr 28, 1910 – May 1911, Medford Griffin

H.M.S. Pinafore  [Revival, Musical, Operetta]
May 29, 1911 – Jul 8, 1911, Performer

Patience  [Revival, Musical, Operetta]
May 6, 1912 – Jun 1, 1912, Reginald Bunthorne

The Pirates of Penzance  [Revival, Musical, Operetta]
Jun 3, 1912 – Jun 26, 1912, Edward

H.M.S. Pinafore  [Revival, Musical, Operetta]
Jun 27, 1912 – Jun 28, 1912, Dick Deadeye

The Mikado  [Revival, Musical, Operetta]
Jun 29, 1912 – Jun 29, 1912, Ko-Ko

The Beggar Student  [Revival, Musical, Comedy, Opera]
Mar 22, 1913, General Ollendorf

The Mikado  [Revival, Musical, Operetta]
Apr 21, 1913 – May 3, 1913, Ko-Ko

H.M.S. Pinafore  [Revival, Musical, Operetta]
May 5, 1913 – May 10, 1913, Dick Deadeye

Iolanthe  [Revival, Musical, Comedy, Operetta]
May 12, 1913 – Jun 14, 1913, The Lord Chancellor

Lieber Augustin  [Original, Musical, Operetta]
Sep 3, 1913 – Oct 4, 1913, Bogumil

Hop o' My Thumb  [Original, Play, Pantomime]
Nov 26, 1913 – Jan 3, 1914, King Mnemonica

H.M.S. Pinafore  [Revival, Musical, Operetta]
Apr 19, 1915 – Jun 19, 1915, Dick Deadeye

Trial by Jury  [Revival, Musical, Operetta]
Apr 19, 1915 – Jun 19, 1915, The Learned Judge

The Yeomen of the Guard  [Revival, Musical, Operetta]
Apr 19, 1915 – May 8, 1915, Jack Point

The Mikado  [Revival, Musical, Operetta]
May 10, 1915 – Jun 19, 1915, Ko-Ko

The Sorcerer  [Revival, Musical, Comedy, Operetta]
May 24, 1915 – Jun 5, 1915, John Wellington Wells

The Pirates of Penzance  [Revival, Musical, Operetta]
Jun 7, 1915 – Jun 18, 1915, Major General Stanley

Iolanthe  [Revival, Musical, Comedy, Operetta]
Jun 10, 1915 – Jun 17, 1915, The Lord Chancellor

The Passing Show of 1917  [Original, Musical, Revue]
Apr 26, 1917 – Oct 13, 1917, Performer

Everything  [Original, Musical, Revue, Spectacle]
Aug 22, 1918 – May 17, 1919, Performer

Erminie  [Revival, Musical, Comedy, Opera]
Jan 3, 1921 – Feb 26, 1921, Ravennes

Snapshots of 1921  [Original, Musical, Revue]
Jun 2, 1921 – Aug 6, 1921, Performer

Some Party  [Original, Musical, Revue]
Apr 15, 1922 – Apr 29, 1922, Producer and Performer

White Lilacs  [Original, Musical, Operetta, Romance]
Sep 10, 1928 – Jan 12, 1929, Dubusson

Radio City Music Hall Inaugural Program  [Original, Special]
Dec 27, 1932 – Dec 27, 1932, Himself

The Monster  [Revival, Play, Drama]
Feb 10, 1933 – Mar 1933, Dr. Gustave Ziska

Filmography

Don Quixote (1915), Alonso Quijano / Don Quixote
Rough Knight (1916)
Mr. Goode, the Samaritan (1916), Alphonse Irving Goode
Sunshine Dad (1916), Alonzo Evergreen (extant; Library of Congress)
Casey at the Bat (1916), Casey
Stranded (1916), H. Ulysses Watts
Intolerance: Love's Struggle Throughout the Ages (1916), extra (extant)
Puppets (1916), Pantaloon
Casey at the Bat (1922), Himself, reading the poem in experimental film made in Phonofilm sound-on-film process; premiered April 15, 1923 at the Rivoli Theater in NYC
At the Round Table (1930) (extant; Library of Congress)
The March of Time (1930), Himself, Old Timer Sequence in unfinished MGM movie
Ladies Not Allowed (1932)

Notes

External links

 
 
 Info on Hopper from the comprehensive musicals 101 site
 "Casey at the Bat" website
 Links to a recording by Hopper of "Casey at the Bat"
 Casey at the Bat (1923) at SilentEra with picture of Hopper in the film
 
 De Wolf Hopper portrait gallery at New York Public Library(Billy Rose Collection)
Collected Works of DeWolf Hopper at archive.org
Once a Clown, Always a Clown: Reminiscences of DeWolf Hopper (1927) at the Internet Archive
The Bright Stars of Yesterday biographical rundown of De Wolfe Hopper's life
 Grave site

1858 births
1935 deaths
19th-century American male actors
20th-century American male actors
Male actors from New York City
American male film actors
American radio personalities
American male silent film actors
Vaudeville performers
American male stage actors
Casey at the Bat
Members of The Lambs Club
The Lambs presidents